Maxwell Alejandro Frost (born January 17, 1997) is an American politician, activist and musician serving as the U.S. representative for  since 2023. He was previously the national organizing director for March for Our Lives. Elected at age 25, he is the first member of Generation Z in Congress. Frost is a Democrat.

Early life
Frost was born on January 17, 1997, to a Puerto Rican woman of Lebanese descent and a Haitian father. His biological mother had several children. He was adopted as an infant; his adoptive mother is a special education teacher who migrated to the United States from Cuba in the Freedom Flights, and his adoptive father is a musician from Kansas. He reconnected with his birth mother in June 2021. Frost attended Osceola County School for the Arts in Kissimmee, Florida. As of June 2022, he is enrolled as a student at Valencia College.

Early career
Frost has been organizing since around 2012, when he was active with Barack Obama's 2012 presidential campaign. He also volunteered with the Newtown Action Alliance, an organization created in response to the Sandy Hook Elementary School shooting. He has identified Occupy Wall Street, the Columbine High School massacre, the killing of Trayvon Martin, and the Orlando nightclub shooting as events that affected his thinking. He later volunteered for Bernie Sanders, Hillary Clinton, and Margaret Good.

Frost survived an incident of gun violence at a Halloween event in Downtown Orlando in 2016.

Frost was an organizer with the American Civil Liberties Union and worked to support Florida's 2018 Amendment 4 and to pressure Joe Biden to stop supporting the Hyde Amendment in 2019. He was the national organizing director for March for Our Lives. In November 2021, Frost was arrested at a voting rights rally in Lafayette Square led by William Barber II and Ben Jealous.

U.S. House of Representatives

Elections

2022 

In August 2021, Frost announced his candidacy for the Democratic nomination for Florida's 10th congressional district. During the primary campaign, he released a television ad in Spanglish, telling The Hill, "Latinos are in a place where their first language is Spanish but they speak English as well, and quite frankly that's me... We speak Spanglish in the house, and I know that's the same for a lot of Latino families in the district."

Frost defeated state Senator Randolph Bracy and former U.S. Representatives Alan Grayson and Corrine Brown, among others, in the August23, 2022, primary. Due to the district's Democratic tilt, Frost was expected to win the general election in November 2022, which he did, defeating Republican Calvin Wimbish by a 19% margin, which was smaller than the 32% margin by which Biden won the district in 2020. Frost is the youngest member of Congress and the first member of Generation Z elected to Congress. He was endorsed by numerous national and local political figures, including Jesse Jackson, former NAACP President Ben Jealous, civil rights activist Dolores Huerta, and U.S. Senators Bernie Sanders and Elizabeth Warren.

Caucus memberships 

Congressional Black Caucus
Congressional Equality Caucus
 Congressional Progressive Caucus

Committees 

 Vice Chair, House Gun Violence Prevention Task Force

Political positions

Environment
Frost supports a Green New Deal. He has identified environmental justice as a priority of his campaign.

Guns
Frost advocates for gun control.

In January 2023, Frost and Representative Jared Moskowitz sent House Speaker Kevin McCarthy a letter asking him to convene a classified meeting to address mass shootings. The letter called for the FBI and other law enforcement agencies to conduct the meeting.

Healthcare
Frost supports single-payer healthcare and investing in pandemic prevention.

Criminal justice
Frost wants to "build toward a future without prison." He supports the decriminalization of sex work and cannabis use.

Israel
Frost supports a two-state solution to the Israeli–Palestinian conflict and has indicated his intent to travel to Israel to promote "US leadership in bringing peace to a region that so desperately needs and deserves it." He has called himself pro-Israel and pro-Palestinian. He supports unconditional U.S. military aid to Israel. He has criticized the Palestinian Authority's martyr's fund that compensates the families of dead and wounded militants, likening it to a recruitment tactic of Hamas for the purpose of committing politically motivated violence against Israel. Frost vehemently opposes the Boycott, Divestment and Sanctions (BDS) movement, accuses it of harboring leadership from terrorist organizations, and suggests that businesses that participate in BDS should in turn be divested.

In early August 2022, the Jewish news website Jewish Insider published a candidate questionnaire from Frost's congressional campaign that showed a shift in Frost's foreign policy positions on Israel and Palestine. Frost had formerly participated in pro-Palestine activism, signing pledges with the Florida Palestine Network (FPN) and the Palestinian Feminist Pledge, calling for support of the Palestinian-led Boycott, Divestment, and Sanctions (BDS) movement, ending military aid to Israel, and rejecting the conflation of anti-Zionism with antisemitism. Jewish Insider characterized his responses as a reversal that distanced himself from his past while declaring an aggressive stance against the BDS movement, calling for unconditional military aid to Israel, and stating his opposition to anti-Zionism. His campaign later released a position paper that formalized these positions.

Crypto regulation 
During his campaign, Frost announced a "crypto-advisory council" that would advise him during his campaign. He received $8,700 in contributions from Sam Bankman-Fried and his brother and nearly $1 million in help from the Super-PAC Protect Our Future, almost all of it after announcing the council.

Personal life 
Frost's biological mother abused crack cocaine while pregnant with him. Upon meeting for the first time, Frost learned that he "trembled" as an infant due to drug withdrawal. He said: "it wasn't her fault".

Frost speaks Spanish and English. He is a jazz drummer and plays the timbales. His nine-member high school band Seguro Que Sí performed in the parade during Obama's second inauguration in 2013.

In December 2022, Frost said he was denied a rental apartment in Washington, D.C., due to a "really bad" credit history. He said his credit rating was bad because he "ran up a lot of debt running for Congress for a year and a half".

Frost was among a handful of Democrats who received about $1 million in support from former billionaire Sam Bankman-Fried's Protect Our Future PAC, as well as the maximum individual donation of $2,900. In December 2022, the U.S. government indicted Bankman-Fried after alleging that he gave investor money to progressive political candidates, among other fraudulent crimes. After the announcement of charges against Bankman-Fried, Frost donated the individual donation to the Zebra Coalition, an LGBTQ charity.

Frost is a fan of the Yu-Gi-Oh! Trading Card Game.

Electoral history

See also
 List of African-American United States representatives
 List of Hispanic and Latino Americans in the United States Congress
 Progressive except Palestine

References

External links 

 Congressman Maxwell Frost official U.S. House website
 Maxwell Frost for Congress campaign website

 
 

|-

|-

1997 births
21st-century African-American politicians
21st-century American politicians
Activists from Florida
African-American activists
African American adoptees
African-American members of the United States House of Representatives
African-American people in Florida politics
American gun control activists
American politicians of Haitian descent
American politicians of Lebanese descent
American Zionists
Democratic Party members of the United States House of Representatives from Florida
Florida Democrats
Generation Z
Hispanic and Latino American members of the United States Congress
Living people
Puerto Rican people in Florida politics